Wives and Lovers is a 1963 comedy film based on the play The First Wife by Jay Presson Allen. Directed by John Rich, it stars Janet Leigh, Van Johnson, Shelley Winters and Martha Hyer. It was nominated for an Academy Award in 1964 for costume design.

Plot
Husband and wife Bill and Bertie Austin and their daughter live in a low-rent apartment. He is a struggling writer, at least until agent Lucinda Ford breaks the news that she has sold his book to a publisher, including the rights to turn it into a Broadway play.

A new house in Connecticut is the first way to celebrate. When Bill is away working on the play, Bertie befriends hard-drinking neighbor Fran Cabrell and her boyfriend Wylie, who plant seeds of suspicion in Bertie's mind that Bill and his beautiful agent might be more than just business partners.

Bertie jealously retaliates by flirting with Gar Aldrich, an actor who will appear in her husband's play. Bill travels to Connecticut for a heart-to-heart talk, finds Gar there and punches him. But when the play is a success, Bill and Bertie decide to give married life one more try.

Cast

Janet Leigh as Bertie Austin
Van Johnson as Bill Austin
Shelley Winters as Fran Cabrell
Martha Hyer as Lucinda Ford
Ray Walston as Wylie Dreberg
Jeremy Slate as Gar Aldrich
 Claire Wilcox as Julie Austin
Lee Patrick as Mrs. Swanson
Dick Wessel as Mr. Liberti
Dave Willock as Dr. Leon Partridge, DDS

Reception 
In a contemporary review for The New York Times, critic Bosley Crowther wrote: "It's incredible that a screenplay as hackneyed and witless as this one could get past a first front-office reading in this rigid day and age, and it is pathetic that it should be directed as woodenly as this one has been by John Rich ... It  is. simply without style or humor, totally flat, and it is laboredly played by Miss Leigh, Miss Hyer, Mr. Johnson, and Shelley Winters and Ray Walston as a couple of drunks—the usual tireless and tedious gag-makers—who are always popping in from next door. Oh, yes—with over-time labor by Jeremy Slate as the Hollywood star. The only difference between this endeavor ... and those of the nineteen-thirties is that the latter were usually better and more—more sophisticated. That's the word I believe they used to use."

Writing in the Los Angeles Times, critic Philip K. Scheuer wrote: "'Wives and Lovers'—title included—might be relegated to the familiar classification of Just Another Sex Comedy, Hollywood Style, but for one rather rare (for Hollywood) distinction. It probes a bit deeper and comes up with a still fundamental, ingrained characteristic of most Americans: Although they may make a great outward show of being 'sophisticated' and morally promiscuous, the Puritan in them usually waggles a warning finger when the sheets are really down."

References

External links
 
 
 

1963 films
1963 directorial debut films
1963 romantic comedy films
1960s sex comedy films
American black-and-white films
American comedy films
American films based on plays
American romantic comedy films
American sex comedy films
1960s English-language films
Films about infidelity
Films about marriage
Films about writers
Films directed by John Rich
Films produced by Hal B. Wallis
Films scored by Lyn Murray
Films set in Connecticut
Films with screenplays by Edward Anhalt
Paramount Pictures films
1960s American films